Emilio Mendogni (13 May 1932 – 10 February 2008) was an Italian Grand Prix motorcycle road racer. His best year was in 1952 when he won two Grand Prix races and finished third in the 125cc world championship behind Cecil Sandford and Carlo Ubbiali. Mendogni won three Grand Prix races during his career.

References 

1932 births
2008 deaths
Sportspeople from Parma
Italian motorcycle racers
125cc World Championship riders
250cc World Championship riders
500cc World Championship riders